Ectoedemia pelops is a moth of the family Nepticulidae. It is found near the Murray–Darling basin in New South Wales, Australia.

The larvae possibly feed on Capparis mitchellii. They probably mine the leaves of their host plant.

External links
Australian Faunal Directory

Moths of Australia
Nepticulidae
Moths described in 2000